Hardly Electronic is the fourth studio album by American indie rock band The Essex Green. It was released on June 29, 2018 under Merge Records.

Critical reception
Hardly Electronic was met with "generally favorable" reviews from critics. At Metacritic, which assigns a weighted average rating out of 100 to reviews from mainstream publications, this release received an average score of 75, based on 7 reviews. Aggregator Album of the Year gave the release an 80 out of 100 based on a critical consensus of 6 reviews.

Track listing

Personnel

Musicians
 Jeff Baron – vocals
 Sasha Bell – guitar
 Christopher Ziter – drums

Production
 Fred Kevorkian – mastering
 Matt Boynton – mixing

References

2018 albums
The Essex Green albums
Merge Records albums